Richard James Ogle (born January 14, 1949) is a former American football linebacker who played college football for Colorado (1968–1970) and professional football in the National Football League (NFL) for the St. Louis Cardinals (1971) and the Detroit Lions (1972). He appeared in a total of 10 NFL games, five as a starter.

Early years
Ogle was born in 1949 in Bozeman, Montana, and attended Bozeman High School. He played college football for the Colorado Buffaloes from 1968 to 1970.

Professional football
He was drafted by the St. Louis Cardinals in the 11th round (277th overall pick) of the 1971 NFL Draft.  He appeared in six games for the Cardinals in 1971, five of them as a starter. In September 1972, he was traded to the Detroit Lions in exchange for running back Paul Gipson. He appeared in four games for the Lions in 1972.

References

1949 births
Living people
American football linebackers
St. Louis Cardinals (football) players
Detroit Lions players
Colorado Buffaloes football players
Sportspeople from Bozeman, Montana
Players of American football from Montana